Hustadvika is a municipality in Møre og Romsdal county, Norway. It is located in the traditional districts of Nordmøre and Romsdal. The administrative centre of the municipality is the village of Elnesvågen. Other villages in the municipality include Hustad, Bud, Tornes, Sylte, Malme, Aureosen, Eide, Lyngstad, Vevang, and Visnes.

The  municipality is the 203rd largest by area out of the 356 municipalities in Norway. Hustadvika is the 90th most populous municipality in Norway with a population of 13,287.

General information
On 1 January 2020, the neighboring municipalities of Eide and Fræna were merged to form the new municipality of Hustadvika.

Name
It is reminiscent of the name for the former municipality, Hustad, which existed from 1918 until its dissolution in 1964.

Coat of arms
The coat of arms was approved in 2019. They were designed by Madelen Behrendt and Øystein Hauge. They are blue with two white interlocking designs representing a fish and a plow. These were chosen to symbolize the two main industries of the municipality: fishing and agriculture.

Churches
The Church of Norway has five parishes within the municipality of Hustadvika. It is part of the Molde domprosti (arch-deanery) in the Diocese of Møre.

Geography

The municipality of Hustadvika sits on the northwestern end of the Romsdal Peninsula along the Hustadvika shoreline, just west of the island of Averøya. The Norwegian Sea lies to the north, the Harøyfjorden, Julsundet strait, and Aukra Municipality lie to the west, Molde Municipality and Gjemnes Municipality lie to the south, and Averøy Municipality and the Kornstadfjorden lie to the east.

The Frænfjorden cuts into the middle of the municipality. The coastal areas are low and marshy while the interior of the municipality is mountainous. Two of the more notable mountains are Jendemsfjellet and Heiane. The Bjørnsund islands lie off the northwestern coast. They are now uninhabited, but the Bjørnsund Lighthouse is still in operation. Kvitholmen Lighthouse lies just off the northern coast of the municipality, in an area with hundreds of small islands and skerries.

Government
All municipalities in Norway, including Hustadvika, are responsible for primary education (through 10th grade), outpatient health services, senior citizen services, unemployment and other social services, zoning, economic development, and municipal roads. The municipality is governed by a municipal council of elected representatives, which in turn elects a mayor.  The municipality falls under the Møre og Romsdal District Court and the Frostating Court of Appeal.

Municipal council
The municipal council  of Hustadvika is made up of 37 representatives that are elected to four year terms. The party breakdown of the council is as follows:

Notable people 

 Oluf Gjerset (1848 in Vaagø – 1941) an American politician, Mayor of Montevideo, Minnesota
 Nilmar Janbu (1921 in Bjørnsund – 2013) a Norwegian engineer and geotechnician
 Arve Hans Otterlei (born 1932) a politician, Mayor of Fræna in 2003, lived in Hustad
 Trond Strande (born 1970) former footballer with 275 club caps with Molde FK, brought up in Elnesvågen
 Jim Svenøy (born 1972 in Fræna) a retired Norwegian athlete, ran the 3000 metre steeplechase
 Jorun Marie Kvernberg (born 1979 in Fræna) musician, singer and composer, plays the hardingfele and violin
 Ola Kvernberg (born 1981 in Fræna) a jazz musician, plays string swing violin

References

External links
Gjenvinningsbedrift gjekk konkurs – ingen tar ansvar for 1000 tonn avfall [Recirculation-company bankrupted - no one takes responsibility for 1000 tons of waste]. 23 November 2020. NRK

 
Nordmøre
Municipalities of Møre og Romsdal
2020 establishments in Norway
Populated places established in 2020